KACT-FM (105.5 FM) is a radio station broadcasting a country music format. Licensed to Andrews, Texas, United States, the station serves the Odessa-Midland area. The station is currently owned by Jessica May Reid and Gerald K. Reid, through licensee Zia Broadcasting Company, and features programming from Westwood One.

References

External links

ACT-FM